The Andorran Football Federation is the governing body of football in Andorra. It was founded in 1994 and joined as a member of FIFA and UEFA in 1996. It organizes the football league, Andorran First Division, the Andorran Cup and Andorran Supercup, and the Andorra national football team. It is based in Escaldes-Engordany.

References

External links
Official website 
Andorra at FIFA site
Andorra at UEFA site

Andorra
Federation
Federation
Sports organizations established in 1994
1994 establishments in Andorra
Football